Last Days Here is a 2011 American documentary film featuring Bobby Liebling, lead singer of doom metal band Pentagram. It is distributed by Sundance Selects.

Synopsis
Last Days Here follows Bobby Liebling, lead singer of Pentagram, an Alexandria, Virginia-based doom metal band founded in 1971 and active sporadically throughout the following four decades. At the film's outset, Liebling is in his 50s, living in his parents' basement, and addicted to drugs. After Pentagram's music is rediscovered by the heavy metal underground scene, Liebling begins to recover from his lifestyle. His friend and manager Sean "Pellet" Pelletier attempts to help Liebling overcome his drug addiction and escape his old life. The film ends in 2010 with Liebling and Pentagram returning to the stage and Liebling sober, married and his new wife expecting their first child.

Production
Co-director Fenton first became familiar with Liebling after listening to Pentagram's 1970s recordings on cassette tape and the 2001 compilation First Daze Here, and enjoying the early Pentagram material. He heard rumors about Liebling, including living in his parents' basement and ingesting illegal drugs. When Fenton and Argott began filming Liebling, they were not sure if a documentary could result. Fenton said, "It really seemed like he was going to smoke himself to death in his parents' basement, something we weren't interested in documenting." When Liebling attempted to recover from his lifestyle, the directors saw potential for a documentary.

The directors filmed hundreds of hours of footage over three years with very little budgeting. Fenton said about addressing the swift changes in Liebling's life, "Many times we had to finesse the rapid shifts in Bobby’s life so the viewer wouldn’t be left confused." He said that Liebling had shown multiple sides of himself, which the directors tried to balance for their documentary.

Release
In the following month, Sundance Selects acquired the rights to distribute Last Days Here in North America. It distributed the documentary in theaters and through its video on demand platform. It was released commercially on July 31, 2012 in DVD format.

Reception
Stephen Saito of Independent Film Channel said Liebling's story was typical of most rock star stories and that his story would normally not be interesting to mainstream viewers since Pentagram never had a mass audience. Saito said, "Yet Fenton... and Argott spent six years waiting for the story to reveal itself and that patience has been rewarded with a tale that's sad, sometimes frustrating and ultimately triumphant." The critic applauded Fenton and Argott's use of supporting characters to share stories about Liebling. Saito noted, "Last Days Here isn't weighed down by history, or much of anything for that matter as it uses a traditionally straightforward, slightly shaggy narrative to tell of Liebling's rise and fall."

References

External links

914Pictures.com - Official website

2011 documentary films
2011 films
American documentary films
Documentary films about heavy metal music and musicians
Documentary films about drug addiction
2010s English-language films
2010s American films